Pagodula is a genus of sea snails, marine gastropod mollusks in the subfamily Pagodulinae of the family Muricidae, the murex snails or rock snails.

Species
Species within the genus Pagodula include:

 Pagodula abyssorum (Verrill, 1885)
 Pagodula aculeata (Watson, 1882)
  †  Pagodula carinata (Bivona, 1832)
 Pagodula cossmanni (Locard, 1897)
 Pagodula diaphana Garrigues & Lamy, 2018
 Pagodula echinata (Kiener, 1840)
 Pagodula fraseri (Knudsen, 1956)
 Pagodula golikovi (Egorov, 1992)
 Pagodula guineensis (Thiele, 1925)
 Pagodula lacunella (Dall, 1889)
 Pagodula limicola Verrill, 1885
 Pagodula mucrone (Houart, 1991)
 Pagodula obtuselirata (Schepman), 1911)
 Pagodula pagoda Garrigues & Lamy, 2018
 Pagodula parechinata Houart, 2001
 † Pagodula vaginata (de Cristofori & Jan, 1832)
 † Pagodula vegrandis P. Marshall & Murdoch, 1923 
 Pagodula verrillii (Bush, 1893)

Species brought into synonymy
 Pagodula acceptans (Barnard, 1959): synonym of Enixotrophon acceptans (Barnard, 1959)
 Pagodula araios (Houart & Engl, 2007): synonym of Enixotrophon araios (Houart & Engl, 2007)
 Pagodula arnaudi (Pastorino, 2002): synonym of Enixotrophon arnaudi (Pastorino, 2002)
 Pagodula atanua Houart & Tröndlé, 2008: synonym of Enixotrophon atanua (Houart & Tröndle, 2008)
 Pagodula carduelis (Watson, 1882): synonym of Enixotrophon carduelis (R. B. Watson, 1882)
 Pagodula carinata (Bivona, 1832) sensu Monterosato, 1884: synonym of Pagodula echinata (Kiener, 1840)
 Pagodula ceciliae (Houart, 2003): synonym of Enixotrophon ceciliae (Houart, 2003)
 Pagodula columbarioides (Pastorino & Scarabino, 2008): synonym of Enixotrophon columbarioides (Pastorino & Scarabino, 2008)
 Pagodula concepcionensis (Houart & Sellanes, 2006): synonym of Enixotrophon concepcionensis (Houart & Sellanes, 2006)
 Pagodula condei (Houart, 2003): synonym of Enixotrophon condei (Houart, 2003)
 Pagodula declinans (Watson, 1882): synonym of Enixotrophon declinans (R. B. Watson, 1882)
 † Pagodula delli (Beu, 1967): synonym of † Enixotrophon delli (Beu, 1967) 
 Pagodula eos B.A. Marshall & Houart, 2011: synonym of Enixotrophon eos (B. A. Marshall & Houart, 2011)
 Pagodula eumorpha B.A. Marshall & Houart, 2011: synonym of Enixotrophon eumorphus (B. A. Marshall & Houart, 2011)
 Pagodula hastula B.A. Marshall & Houart, 2011: synonym of Enixotrophon hastulus (B. A. Marshall & Houart, 2011)
 Pagodula kosunorum Houart & Lan, 2003: synonym of Enixotrophon kosunorum (Houart & Lan, 2003)
 Pagodula lata B.A. Marshall & Houart, 2011: synonym of Enixotrophon latus (B. A. Marshall & Houart, 2011)
 Pagodula lochi B.A. Marshall & Houart, 2011: synonym of Enixotrophon lochi (B. A. Marshall & Houart, 2011)
 Pagodula macquariensis (Powell, 1957): synonym of Enixotrophon macquariensis (Powell, 1957)
 Pagodula maxwelli B.A. Marshall & Houart, 2011: synonym of Enixotrophon maxwelli (B. A. Marshall & Houart, 2011)
 Pagodula multigrada (Houart, 1990): synonym of Enixotrophon multigradus (Houart, 1990)
 Pagodula obtusa B.A. Marshall & Houart, 2011: synonym of Enixotrophon obtusus (B. A. Marshall & Houart, 2011)
 Pagodula occidua B.A. Marshall & Houart, 2011: synonym of Enixotrophon occiduus (B. A. Marshall & Houart, 2011)
 Pagodula planispina (Smith, 1892): synonym of Enixotrophon planispinus (E. A. Smith, 1906)
 Pagodula plicilaminata (Verco, 1909): synonym of Enixotrophon plicilaminatus (Verco, 1909)
 Pagodula poirieria (Powell, 1951): synonym of Enixotrophon poirieria (Powell, 1951)
 Pagodula procera Houart, 2001: synonym of Enixotrophon procerus (Houart, 2001)
 Pagodula pulchella (Schepman, 1911): synonym of Enixotrophon pulchellus (Schepman, 1911)
 Pagodula pygmaea B.A. Marshall & Houart, 2011: synonym of Enixotrophon pygmaeus (B. A. Marshall & Houart, 2011)
 Pagodula sansibarica (Thiele, 1925): synonym of Enixotrophon sansibaricus (Thiele, 1925)
 Pagodula siberutensis (Thiele, 1925): synonym of Enixotrophon siberutensis (Thiele, 1925)
 Pagodula tangaroa B.A. Marshall & Houart, 2011: synonym of Enixotrophon tangaroa (B. A. Marshall & Houart, 2011)
 Pagodula tenuirostrata (Smith, 1899): synonym of Enixotrophon tenuirostratus (E. A. Smith, 1899)
 Pagodula venusta B.A. Marshall & Houart, 2011: synonym of Enixotrophon venustus (B. A. Marshall & Houart, 2011)
 Pagodula veronicae (Pastorino, 1999): synonym of Enixotrophon veronicae (Pastorino, 1999)
 Pagodula ziczac (Tiba, 1981): synonym of Enixotrophon ziczac (Tiba, 1981)

References

 Houart, R. & Sellanes, J. (2006). New data on recently described Chilean trophonines (Gastropoda: Muricidae), with the description of a new species and notes of their occurrence at a cold-seep site. Zootaxa. 1222: 53-68.
 Merle D., Garrigues B. & Pointier J.-P. (2011) Fossil and Recent Muricidae of the world. Part Muricinae. Hackenheim: Conchbooks. 648 pp. page(s): 156

External links
 Monterosato T. A. (di) (1884). Nomenclatura generica e specifica di alcune conchiglie mediterranee. Palermo, Virzi, 152 pp
 Barco A., Schiaparelli S., Houart R., Oliverio M. (2012). Cenozoic evolution of Muricidae (Mollusca, Neogastropoda) in the Southern Ocean, with the description of a new subfamily. Zoologica Scripta, vol. 41, p. 596-616, 
 De Gregorio, A. (1885). Continuazione degli studi su talune conchiglie mediterranee viventi e fossili. Bullettino della Società Malacologica Italiana. 11: 27-203.
 Marshall B.A. & Houart R. (2011) The genus Pagodula (Mollusca: Gastropoda: Muricidae) in Australia, the New Zealand region and the Tasman Sea. New Zealand Journal of Geology and Geophysics 54(1): 89-114.